Rapelhuapi Airport  is an airport on the north shore of Rapel Lake, in the O'Higgins Region of Chile.

There is rising terrain north through east.

See also

Transport in Chile
List of airports in Chile

References

External links
OpenStreetMap - Rapelhuapi
OurAirports - Rapelhuapi
SkyVector - Rapelhuapi

Airports in Chile
Airports in Santiago Metropolitan Region